William Griggs was a doctor in Salem Village, Massachusetts. He is best known as the doctor who diagnosed the Salem Villagers as possessed, during the time of the Salem witch trials. Griggs was in charge of diagnosing and determining how "much" of a witch they were. Griggs claimed that the "afflicted" girls were "under an Evil hand" (most likely referring to the Devil).

References

External links 
 http://www2.iath.virginia.edu/saxon-salem/servlet/SaxonServlet?source=salem/texts/bios.xml&style=salem/xsl/dynaxml.xsl&chunk.id=b47&clear-stylesheet-cache=yes
 http://www2.iath.virginia.edu/saxon-salem/servlet/SaxonServlet?source=salem/texts/names.xml&style=salem/xsl/dynaxml.xsl&group.num=all&mbio.num=mb47&clear-stylesheet-cache=yes

Year of birth missing
Year of death missing
17th-century American physicians
Physicians from Massachusetts
People of the Salem witch trials
Witch hunters